Two Supreme Court cases, Wisconsin v. Michigan, 295 U.S. 455 (1935) and Wisconsin v. Michigan, 297 U.S. 547 (1936), settled a territorial dispute between Wisconsin and Michigan.

Background  
The 1836 boundary description between Wisconsin and Michigan described the line through northwest Lake Michigan as "the most usual ship channel".  This description needed clarification as two routes were in use into Green Bay. Multiple islands lay in between and all were claimed as part of both Door County, Wisconsin, and Delta County, Michigan. A similar case, Michigan v. Wisconsin 270 U.S. 295 (1926), had previously been brought to the Supreme Court but was dismissed.

Decision 
In 1936, the Supreme Court decision chose the ship channel through the Rock Island Passage as the more common, so Wisconsin retained the intervening water area with its islands: Plum, Detroit, Washington, Hog, and Rock.

See also 
Toledo War: a border dispute between Michigan and Ohio

References

 (Archived September 25, 2009)
 (Archived August 3, 2008)
Captain Cram's reports were printed in:

External links
 
 

Legal history of Michigan
Legal history of Wisconsin
United States Supreme Court cases
1936 in United States case law
1936 in Michigan
1936 in Wisconsin
United States Supreme Court cases of the Hughes Court
Internal territorial disputes of the United States
United States Supreme Court original jurisdiction cases
Borders of Michigan
Borders of Wisconsin
Lake Michigan
Door County, Wisconsin
Delta County, Michigan